Terence "Terry" Ramshaw (birth registered fourth ¼ 1943 – 9 January 2017) was an English professional rugby league footballer who played in the 1960s and 1970s.

Background
Terry Ramshaw's birth was registered in Pontefract district, West Riding of Yorkshire, England, and he died aged 73.

Playing career

Club career
Terry Ramshaw made his début for Featherstone Rovers on Saturday 19 August 1961, he played his last match for the Featherstone Rovers during the 1965–66 season, he was transferred from the Featherstone Rovers to Halifax, he was transferred from Halifax to Bradford Northern during October 1967, he was transferred from Bradford Northern to Wakefield Trinity during August 1968, he made his début Wakefield Trinity, and scored a try in the 31-12 victory over Salford at Belle Vue, Wakefield on Saturday 24 August 1968, he scored 2-tries in the 59-3 victory over Hunslet F.C. during March 1970, he scored 2-tries in the 42-6 win over Workington Town in December 1970, he played  alongside Peter Harrison in his last match for Wakefield Trinity in the 38-10 victory over Barrow at Belle Vue, Wakefield on Saturday 2 October 1971, he was transferred from Wakefield Trinity to Salford during October 1971, he was transferred from Salford to the Hull Kingston Rovers, he was transferred from the Hull Kingston Rovers to Oldham, he made his début for Oldham during the 1975–76 season, he played his last match for Oldham during the 1976–77 season, and he was transferred from Oldham to York.

Championship final appearances
Terry Ramshaw played in Halifax's 12-35 defeat by St. Helens in the Championship Final during the 1965-66 season at Station Road, Swinton on Saturday 28 May 1966.

Championship semi-Final appearances
Terry Ramshaw played in Wakefield Trinity's 15-49 defeat by Wigan in the Championship semi-final during the 1970-71 season.

Challenge Cup semi-Final appearances
Terry Ramshaw played in Wakefield Trinity's defeat by Castleford in the 1968–69 Challenge Cup semi-final during the 1968-69 season.

County Cup Final appearances
Terry Ramshaw played left-, i.e. number 11, in the Featherstone Rovers' 0-10 defeat by Halifax in the 1963–64 Yorkshire County Cup Final during the 1963-64 season at Belle Vue, Wakefield on Saturday 2 November 1963, in front of a crowd of 13,238, and played as an  interchange/substitute, i.e. number 15 (replacing right-, i.e. number 12, Barry Hollis) in York's 8-18 defeat by Bradford Northern in the 1978–79 Yorkshire County Cup Final during the 1978-79 season at Headingley Rugby Stadium, Leeds on Saturday 28 October 1978, in front of a crowd of 10,429.

Players №6 Trophy Final appearances
Terry Ramshaw played  in Salford's 7-12 defeat by Leeds in the 1973 Player's №6 Trophy Final during the 1972-73 season at Fartown Ground, Huddersfield on Saturday 24 March 1973, in front of a crowd of 10,102.

Notable tour matches
Terry Ramshaw played, and scored the winning try in the Featherstone Rovers' 23-17 victory over Australia in the 1963–64 Kangaroo tour of Great Britain and France match during the 1963-64 season at Post Office Road, Featherstone on Wednesday 2 October 1963, in front of a crowd of 7,898.

Representative honours
On 3 April 1965, Ramshaw played in the first ever Great Britain under-24 international match in a 17–9 win against France under-24's.

Ramshaw played in Yorkshire's 17–22 defeat by Lancashire in the 1966-67 County Championship during the 1966-67 season at Headingley Rugby Stadium, Leeds on Wednesday 21 September 1966.

Genealogical information
Terry Ramshaw's marriage to Sandra (née Lynch) was registered during second ¼ 1964 in Pontefract district. They had children; Stephanie Louise Ramshaw (birth registered during first ¼  in Pontefract district), and the rugby league footballer who played in the 1980s, 1990s and 2000s for Halifax and Keighley Cougars (captain), Jason Lee Ramshaw (birth registered during third ¼ 1969 in Wakefield district (born ).

References

External links
Statistics at orl-heritagetrust.org.uk

1943 births
2017 deaths
Bradford Bulls players
English rugby league players
Featherstone Rovers players
Halifax R.L.F.C. players
Hull Kingston Rovers players
Oldham R.L.F.C. coaches
Oldham R.L.F.C. players
Rugby league players from Pontefract
Rugby league props
Rugby league second-rows
Salford Red Devils players
Wakefield Trinity players
York Wasps players
Yorkshire rugby league team players